The Thieves of Fortress Badabaskor is an adventure for fantasy role-playing games published by Judges Guild in 1978.

Contents
The Thieves of Fortress Badabaskor is a scenario set in the five-level dungeon lair of a band of brigands.  The upper levels of the dungeon are for low-level characters, but the deeper levels are more difficult. It includes a description of a new evil deity.

Publication history
The Thieves of Fortress Badabaskor was written by Marc Summerlott, Bob Bledsaw, Mike Petrowsky, Craig Fogel, Bill Owen, and Tony Floren, and was published by Judges Guild in 1978 as a 32-page book.

A listing of cumulative sales from 1981 shows that The Thieves of Fortress Badabaskor sold over 15,000 units.

Reception
 Don Turnbull reviewed The Thieves of Fortress Badabaskor for White Dwarf #7. Turnbull commented: "This is an excellent package, and particularly inexpensive – buy it without further delay!"

Patrick Amory reviewed Thieves of Fortress Badabaskor for Different Worlds magazine and stated that "Yet another fairly early release, Thieves will be good for many hours of solid, typical D&D."

References

Judges Guild fantasy role-playing game adventures
Role-playing game supplements introduced in 1978